The Sysola is located mainly in Northwestern Russia's Komi Republic, although its two branches have their sources in the Kirov Oblast, and the Perm Oblast. The Sysola is a tributary of the larger Vychegda, which it meets in Syktyvkar.

References

Rivers of the Komi Republic